Beslan Alekseyevich Ajinjal (born 22 June 1974) is a Russian football coach and a former player from Abkhazia. He is the manager of FC Druzhba Maykop.

Club career
Ajinjal started his career at football club at Abkhaz ASSR. After Georgia declared independence in 1991, both brothers left for the Russian club FC Druzhba Maykop.

Coaching career
Ajinjal is currently manager of Abkhazia.

Personal life
He is an identical twin brother of Ruslan Ajinjal.

Honours
 Russian First Division best midfielder: 2004.
 Russian Second Division Zone Centre best midfielder: 2010.

References

External links
https://web.archive.org/web/20081001173027/http://www.rfpl.org/clubs.shtml?team=10&act=players&id=1369&year=2008
 

1974 births
Living people
People from Gagra District
Footballers from Abkhazia
Soviet footballers
Russian footballers
FC Dinamo Sukhumi players
FC Baltika Kaliningrad players
FC Moscow players
FC Torpedo Moscow players
FC Luch Vladivostok players
FC Tom Tomsk players
FC Kuban Krasnodar players
FC Shinnik Yaroslavl players
FC Sokol Saratov players
Russian Premier League players
Russian twins
Twin sportspeople
Association football midfielders